Ammoplanus is a genus of aphid wasps in the family Crabronidae. There are more than 50 described species in Ammoplanus.

Species
These 51 species belong to the genus Ammoplanus:

 Ammoplanus alpinensis N. Smith, 2009
 Ammoplanus angularis Gussakovskij, 1952
 Ammoplanus atacamensis Sielfeld, 1980
 Ammoplanus atlasensis Boucek, 2001
 Ammoplanus bifidus N. Smith, 2009
 Ammoplanus bischoffi Maréchal, 1938
 Ammoplanus biscopula Boucek, 2001
 Ammoplanus biskrensis Boucek, 2001
 Ammoplanus blascoi Boucek & Gayubo, 2001
 Ammoplanus ceballosi Giner Marí, 1943
 Ammoplanus chemehuevi Pate, 1943
 Ammoplanus clemente Menke, 1997
 Ammoplanus curvidens Tsuneki, 1972
 Ammoplanus denesi Boucek, 2001
 Ammoplanus diversipes Gussakovskij, 1931
 Ammoplanus dusmeti Giner Marí, 1943
 Ammoplanus freidbergi Boucek, 2001
 Ammoplanus friedbergi Boucek, 2001
 Ammoplanus gegen Tsuneki, 1972
 Ammoplanus gengen Tsuneki, 1972
 Ammoplanus gilberti N. Smith, 2009
 Ammoplanus hofferi Snoflak, 1943
 Ammoplanus insularis Giner Marí, 1943
 Ammoplanus kaplanae Boucek, 2001
 Ammoplanus kaszabi Tsuneki, 1972
 Ammoplanus kazenasi Boucek, 2001
 Ammoplanus kohlii Kohl, 1898
 Ammoplanus kondarensis Marshakov, 1976
 Ammoplanus loti Pate, 1943
 Ammoplanus mandibularis Cameron, 1903
 Ammoplanus marathroicus (De Stefani Perez, 1887)
 Ammoplanus minutus Boucek, 2001
 Ammoplanus molliekayae N. Smith, 2009
 Ammoplanus monticola Gussakovskij, 1952
 Ammoplanus nasutus Tsuneki, 1972
 Ammoplanus pallidus N. Smith, 2009
 Ammoplanus perrisi Giraud, 1869
 Ammoplanus platytarsus Gussakovskij, 1931
 Ammoplanus pragensis Snoflak, 1945
 Ammoplanus quabajai Pate, 1943
 Ammoplanus rhinoceros N. Smith, 2009
 Ammoplanus rjabovi Gussakovskij, 1931
 Ammoplanus serratus Tsuneki, 1972
 Ammoplanus strumae Boucek, 2001
 Ammoplanus sulcifrons N. Smith, 2009
 Ammoplanus surrufus N. Smith, 2009
 Ammoplanus tetli Pate, 1943
 Ammoplanus torresi Gayubo, 1991
 Ammoplanus transcaspicus Gussakovskij, 1931
 Ammoplanus unami Pate, 1937
 Ammoplanus vanyumi Pate, 1943

References

Crabronidae
Articles created by Qbugbot